"Tingly" was a song recorded by Pop! featuring Angie Hart. It was written by Amy Flower (formerly known as Tony Stott) and John Richards of About Six Feet, and released as Flower's solo side project. Recorded in an hour on Good Friday 1995, the vocals were performed by Angie Hart, who was then in the highly successful band Frente. It was released on October 9, 1995 and became a popular song on the radio, making it on to Triple J Hottest 100, 1995. The single peaked at #92 on the Australian ARIA singles chart in December 1995.  It was also featured in dozens of episodes of Neighbours and Home and Away, and was featured on the first Home and Away soundtrack album.

Named "Single of the Week" in both Beat Magazine and 3D, and "Single Of The Year" in the Sydney Telegraph Mirror, "Tingly" was particularly loved by JJJ's Richard Kingsmill. Kingsmill was instrumental in its release, having played it repeatedly when it was sent to him as a demo recording. He was originally asked to stop playing it by White Records, home of Frente, who had not given permission for Hart to make the recording. In the end, White - somewhat begrudgingly - released it as a 5-track single, but refused to make a video for it. There was concern in the company that the song would harm Frente's move to a more adult sound, which they were trying with the Shape album (released a year later in 1996). While never a hit, it received critical acclaim and sold well over a long period.

Charts

References

External links
 Tingly lyrics at inthe00s.com

1995 songs
Australian pop songs